Craig Moore  is an American baseball coach and former shortstop, who is the current head baseball coach of the Ohio Bobcats. He played college baseball at Nebraska. He then served as the head coach of the Western Texas Westerners (2007–2010).

Playing career
Moore attended Archbishop Bergan High School and played college baseball at Nebraska.

Coaching career
Moore began his coaching career as the hitting coach at Tennessee Tech under head coach, Matt Bragga. After three years as the top assistant to Bragga, Moore was named the head baseball coach at Western Texas College. Moore would lead the Western Texas program for four seasons. His stint in Texas ended when he accepted an assistant coaching position for the Creighton Bluejays, returning to his home state. After two season at Creighton, Moore joined the coaching staff of the Ohio Bobcats.

On January 21, 2021, Ohio head coach Rob Smith retired, and Moore was named the interim head coach of the Bobcats. On July 20, 2021, Moore was promoted to the full time head coach of the Bobcats.

Head coaching record

References

External links

 Ohio Bobcats bio

Nebraska Cornhuskers baseball players
Lake Erie Storm baseball coaches
Tennessee Tech Golden Eagles baseball coaches
Western Texas Westerners baseball coaches
Creighton Bluejays baseball coaches
Ohio Bobcats baseball coaches
Baseball players from Nebraska
Baseball shortstops
Living people
Year of birth missing (living people)
Lake Erie College alumni
Baseball coaches from Nebraska